Alan Sydney Harvey Johnson was Archdeacon of Bombay from 1951 until 1958.

Johnson was educated Bishop’s College, Calcutta; and ordained in 1937.  He was Chaplain at Byculla, Berar and Parel before his time as Archdeacon.

References

Archdeacons of Bombay